Juventus Football Club is an Italian professional association football club based in Turin, Piedmont that competes in Serie A, the top football league in the country. The club was formed in 1897 as Sport Club Juventus by a group of Massimo d'Azeglio Lyceum young students and played its first competitive match on 11 March 1900, when it entered the Piedmont round of the third Federal Championship.

This list encompasses the major honours won by Juventus and records set by the club, their managers and their players. The individual records section includes details of the club's leading goalscorers and those who have made most appearances in first-team competitions. The club's players have received, among others, a record twelve Serie A Footballer of the Year, the award given by the Italian Footballers' Association (AIC), eight Ballon d'Or awards and four FIFA World Player of the Year awards, more than any other Italian club and third overall in the latter two cases.

Honours 

Italy's most successful club of the 20th century with the most title in the history of Italian football, Juventus have won the Italian League Championship, the country's premier football club competition and organised by Lega Nazionale Professionisti Serie A (LNPA), a record 36 times and have the record of consecutive triumphs in that tournament (nine, between 2011–12 and 2019–20). They have also won the Coppa Italia, the country's primary single-elimination competition, a record fourteen times, becoming the first team to retain the trophy successfully with their triumph in the 1959–60 season, and the first to win it in three consecutive seasons from the 2014–15 season to the 2016–17 season, going on to win a fourth consecutive title in 2017–18 (also a record). In addition, the club holds the record for Supercoppa Italiana wins with nine, the most recent coming in 2020.

Overall, Juventus have won 70 official competitions, more than any other club in the country: 59 at national level (which is also a record) and eleven at international stage, making them, in the latter case, the second most successful Italian team. The club is currently sixth in Europe and twelfth in the world with the most international titles won officially recognised by their respective continental football confederation and Fédération Internationale de Football Association (FIFA). In 1977, the Torinese side become the first in Southern Europe to have won the UEFA Cup and the first—and only to date—in Italian football history to achieve an international title with a squad composed by national footballers. In 1993, the club won its third competition's trophy, an unprecedented feat in the continent until then, a confederation record for the next 22 years and the most for an Italian team. Juventus was also the first club in the country to achieve the title in the European Super Cup, having won the competition in 1984, and the first European side to win the Intercontinental Cup in 1985, since it was restructured by Union of European Football Associations (UEFA) and Confederación Sudamericana de Fútbol (CONMEBOL)'s organizing committee five years beforehand.

The club has earned the distinction of being allowed to wear three golden stars on its shirts representing its league victories: the tenth of which was achieved during the 1957–58 season, the twentieth in the 1981–82 season and the thirtieth officially in the 2013–14 season. Juventus were the first Italian team to have achieved the national double four times (winning the Italian top tier division and the national cup competition in the same season), in the 1959–60, 1994–95, 2014–15 and 2015–16 seasons. In the 2015–16 season, Juventus won the Coppa Italia for the eleventh time and their second-straight title, becoming the first team in Italy's history to complete Serie A and Coppa Italia doubles in back-to-back seasons; Juventus would go on to win another two consecutive doubles in 2016–17 and 2017–18.

In 1985, Juventus became the first club in the history of European football to have won all three major UEFA competitions, the European Champion Clubs' Cup, the (now-defunct) UEFA Cup Winners' Cup and the UEFA Cup, being also the only one to reach it with the same coach. After their triumph in the Intercontinental Cup in the same year, Juventus also became the first football team ever—remaining the only one at 2022—to have won all possible official confederation tournaments.

Only in the 1910s the club has not won any official competition, a unique case in the country. In terms of overall official trophies won, Juventus' most successful decade was the 2010s. In that period the club won eighteen competitions, ahead of the 1980s and 1990s (both with eleven titles).

National titles 
 Italian Football Championship/Serie A
 Winners (36): 1905, 1925–26, 1930–31, 1931–32, 1932–33, 1933–34, 1934–35, 1949–50, 1951–52, 1957–58, 1959–60, 1960–61, 1966–67, 1971–72, 1972–73, 1974–75, 1976–77, 1977–78, 1980–81, 1981–82, 1983–84, 1985–86, 1994–95, 1996–97, 1997–98, 2001–02, 2002–03, 2011–12, 2012–13, 2013–14, 2014–15, 2015–16, 2016–17, 2017–18, 2018–19, 2019–20
 Runners-up (21): 1903, 1904, 1906, 1937–38, 1945–46, 1946–47, 1947–48, 1952–53, 1953–54, 1962–63, 1973–74, 1975–76, 1979–80, 1982–83, 1986–87, 1991–92, 1993–94, 1995–96, 1999–2000, 2000–01, 2008–09
 Coppa Italia
 Winners (14): 1937–38, 1941–42, 1958–59, 1959–60, 1964–65, 1978–79, 1982–83, 1989–90, 1994–95, 2014–15, 2015–16, 2016–17, 2017–18, 2020–21
 Runners-up (7): 1972–73, 1991–92, 2001–02, 2003–04, 2011–12, 2019–20, 2021–22
 Supercoppa Italiana
 Winners (9): 1995, 1997, 2002, 2003, 2012, 2013, 2015, 2018, 2020
 Runners-up (8): 1990, 1998, 2005, 2014, 2016, 2017, 2019, 2021
 Serie B
 Winners (1): 2006–07

European titles 
 European Cup / UEFA Champions League
 Winners (2): 1984–85, 1995–96
 Runners-up (7): 1972–73, 1982–83, 1996–97, 1997–98, 2002–03, 2014–15, 2016–17
 European Cup Winners' Cup
 Winners (1): 1983–84
 UEFA Cup
 Winners (3): 1976–77, 1989–90, 1992–93
 Runners-up (1): 1994–95
 UEFA Intertoto Cup
 Winners (1): 1999
 European / UEFA Super Cup
 Winners (2): 1984, 1996
 Finalists (1): 1985

Worldwide titles 
 Intercontinental Cup
 Winners (2): 1985, 1996
 Runners-up (1): 1973

Other honours 
 National Department of Public Education Cup (3): 1900, 1901, 1902
 Government of City of Torino's Gold Medal: 1901
 City of Torino's Cup (2): 1902, 1903
 Trino Vercellese's Tournament (1): 1903
 International University Cup (1): 1904
 Luigi Bozino Cup (2): 1905, 1906
 Luserna San Giovanni Cup (1): 1907
 Palla d'Argento Henry Dapples (2): 1908
 Federal Championship of Prima Categoria (James R. Spensley's Cup) (1): 1908
 Italian Championship of Prima Categoria (R. Buni's Cup) (1): 1909
 Biella Cup (1): 1909
 FIAT Tournament (1): 1945
 Pio Marchi Cup (1): 1945
 Cup of the Alps (1): 1963

 Italian-Spanish Friendship's Cup (1): 1965
 Pier Cesare Baretti Memorial (2): 1992, 1993
 First Centenary 1897–1997 Cup: Republic of San Marino Trophy: 1997
 Birra Moretti Trophy (6): 1997, 2000, 2003, 2004, 2006, 2008
 Trofeo Luigi Berlusconi (11): 1991, 1995, 1998, 1999, 2000, 2001, 2003, 2004, 2010, 2012, 2021
 TIM Trophy (1): 2009

Awards and recognitions

National 
 Awarded by the Golden Stars for Sport Excellence by the Italian Football Federation (FIGC): 3
 1958, 1982 and 2014
 Awarded as Italy's Club Team of the Year by the Italian Footballers' Association (AIC): 9
 1997, 1998, 2012, 2013, 2014, 2015, 2016, 2017 and 2018
 Awarded as Italy's Sports Team of the Year by the newspaper La Gazzetta dello Sport: 5
 1985, 1996, 2013, 2015 and 2017
 Awarded as Piedmont's Sports Team of the Year by the Unione Stampa Sportiva Italiana (USSI): 2
 2012 and 2013

International 
 Nominated Best Italian football club of the 20th Century and seventh best club in the world in 20th century period by the International Federation of Association Football (FIFA)
 23 December 2000
 Nominated Italy's most successful club of the 20th Century and second best European football club in 1901–2000 period by the International Federation of Football History & Statistics (IFFHS)
 10 September 2009
 Nominated Italy's most successful club and sixth best world football club of the second decade of the 21st Century (2011–2020 period) by the IFFHS
 23 March 2021
 Nominated Italy's most successful club and sixth best European football club of the second decade of the 21st Century (2011–2020 period) by the IFFHS
 18 March 2021
 Nominated Best Italian club in the All-Time World Ranking by the International Federation of Football History & Statistics
 for three years since the institution of the ranking in 2007
 Awarded as IFFHS The World's Club Team of the Year by the International Federation of Football History & Statistics: 2
 1993 and 1996
 Awarded as IFFHS The World's Club Team of the Month by the International Federation of Football History & Statistics: 4
 January 2004, September 2005, January 2012 and December 2012
 Awarded as World's Sports Team of the Year by the Association Internationale de la Presse Sportive (AIPS): 2
 1984–85 and 1985–86 seasons
 Nominated Champion of the Century in Italian football and second most successful club of the 20th century by the Brazilian sports magazine Placar
 November 1999
 Placed 7th in the ranking of the best association football clubs in history by German Kicker-Sportmagazin
 March 2014
 Awarded as World's Sports Team of the Year by the Italian newspaper La Gazzetta dello Sport: 1
 1985
 Awarded as European Club Team of the Year by the French sports magazine France Football: 2
 1977 and 1990
 Placed 1st in the IFFHS Club World Ranking by the International Federation of Football History & Statistics
 16 times since the institution of the ranking in 1991
 Placed 1st in the UEFA club coefficient ranking by the Union of European Football Associations
 for seven seasons since the institution of the ranking in 1979

Other 
 Awarded by the Umberto Meazza Cup by the Italian Football Federation (FIGC): 1
 1939
 Gianni Brera Award to the Sports Personality of the Year: 1
 2013
 Awarded with the Champions of Europe Plaque by Union of European Football Associations (UEFA): 1
 2005

Achievements 
As one of the most successful sportive clubs in Italy and the world, Juventus have received during their history of important national and international special recognitions, among them:
 Medaglia di Bronzo al Valore Atletico: 1935
 received on 7 July 1935 at Rome from the Italian National Olympic Committee (CONI) in recognition to the fifth consecutive Serie A title won (Italian record).
 Stella d'oro al Merito Sportivo: 1966
 received on 22 June 1967 at Rome from the CONI in recognition for the club's outstanding contribution to the Italian sport.
 Collare d'oro al Merito Sportivo: 2001
 received on 10 November 2004 at Rome from the Italian National Olympic Committee in recognition for the club's contribution to the Italian football and sport.
 The UEFA Plaque: 1988
 received on 12 July 1988 at Geneva (Switzerland) by the Union of European Football Associations in recognition as first club in European football history in triumph in the all three seasonal UEFA competitions.

Divisional movements

Individual records

Appearances

Appearances in competitive matches 
 Most appearances in total – 705 matches, Alessandro Del Piero (1993–2012)
 Most Serie A appearances – 489 matches, Gianluigi Buffon (2001–2018, 2019–2021)
 Most Serie B appearances – 37 matches, Gianluigi Buffon, Alessandro Birindelli and Federico Balzaretti (2006–2007)
 Most Coppa Italia appearances – 89 matches, Giuseppe Furino (1969–1984)
 Most Supercoppa Italiana appearances – 8 matches, Gianluigi Buffon (2002–2017)
 Most UEFA club competitions appearances – 127 matches, Alessandro Del Piero (1993–2012)
 Most European Champions Cup/UEFA Champions League appearances – 117 matches, Gianluigi Buffon (2001–2018, 2019–2021)
 Most UEFA Cup/UEFA Europa League appearances – 42 matches, Roberto Bettega (1970–1980)
 Most UEFA Cup Winners' Cup appearances – 17 matches, Stefano Tacconi (1983–1991)
 Most UEFA Intertoto Cup appearances – 6 matches, Ciro Ferrara, Darko Kovačević, Edwin van der Sar (1999)
 Most appearances in total for a manager – 596 matches, Giovanni Trapattoni (1976–1986 and 1991–1994)
 Most Serie A appearances for a manager – 402 matches, Giovanni Trapattoni (1976–1986 and 1991–1994)
 Most Coppa Italia appearances for a manager – 101 matches, Giovanni Trapattoni (1976–1986 and 1991–1994)
 Most European Champions Cup/UEFA Champions League appearances for a manager – 76 matches, Marcello Lippi (1995–1999 and 2001–2004)
 Most UEFA Cup/UEFA Europa League appearances for a manager – 36 matches, Giovanni Trapattoni (1976–1986 and 1991–1994)
 First Juventus player to play for Italy – Giovanni Giacone (28 March 1920: Switzerland vs. Italy 3–0)
 Youngest player to play for Juventus – Pietro Pastore; 15 years, 222 days
 Oldest player to play for Juventus – Gianluigi Buffon;

All-time top 10 appearances 
As of 12 March 2023 (competitive matches only):

 Note: bold signifies current Juventus player.
 Italian championship = Serie A + Serie B
 Europe = European Champions Cup/Champions League, Inter-Cities Fairs Cup, UEFA Cup/Europa League, Cup Winners' Cup, UEFA Intertoto Cup.
 Other = Supercoppa Italiana, UEFA Super Cup, Intercontinental Cup, European Cup Playoff, Central European Cup (Mitropa Cup).

Goalkeeping 
 Most appearances in total as a goalkeeper – 685 matches, Gianluigi Buffon (2001–2018, 2019–2021)
 Most appearances in Serie A as a goalkeeper – 489 matches, Gianluigi Buffon (2001–2018, 2019–2021)
 Most appearances in Coppa Italia as a goalkeeper –  74 matches, Dino Zoff (1972–1983)
 Most appearances in European Champions Cup/UEFA Champions League as a goalkeeper – 117 matches, Gianluigi Buffon (2001–2018, 2019–2021)
 Longest period without conceding a goal in the Italian Football Championship/Serie A: 934 minutes, Gianpiero Combi, matchdays 3–13 (10*90 minutes); from Juventus 6–0 Milan (25 October 1925) to Parma 0–3 Juventus + 34 minutes of Juventus 3–2 Padova (7 March 1926) in 1925–26
 Longest period without conceding a goal in the Serie A: 974 minutes, Gianluigi Buffon, 26 minutes of Sampdoria 1–2 Juventus (10 January 2016) + matchdays 20–29 (10*90 minutes) + 48 minutes of Torino 1–4 Juventus (20 March 2016) in 2015–16.
Most clean sheets for the club: 308, Gianluigi Buffon (2001–2018, 2019–2021)
Most clean sheets for the club in Serie A: 296, Gianluigi Buffon (2001–2018, 2019–2021)
 Most consecutive Serie A clean sheets – 10, Gianluigi Buffon, 2015–16, from matchday 20 to matchday 29
Most clean sheets in a Serie A season – 22 in 38 matches, Gianluigi Buffon (19) and Marco Storari (3) in 2013–14, Gianluigi Buffon (21) and Neto (1) in 2015–16, Gianluigi Buffon (11) and Wojciech Szczęsny (11) in 2017–18

Goalscorers

Goalscorers in competitive matches 
Most goals in total aggregate – 290 goals in 705 matches, Alessandro Del Piero (1993–2012)
Most goals in a single season:
 In European Champions Cup/UEFA Champions League: 10 goals in 10 matches, Alessandro Del Piero (1997–98)
 In UEFA Cup Winners' Cup: 9 goals in 8 matches, Roberto Baggio (1990–91)
 In UEFA Cup/UEFA Europa League: 10 goals in 8 matches, Darko Kovačević (1999–2000)
In Inter-Cities Fairs Cup: 10 goals in 9 matches, Pietro Anastasi (1970–71)
 In Federal Championship = Prima Divisione/Serie A: 35 goals in 24 matches, Ferenc Hirzer (1925–26)
In Coppa Italia: 9 goals in 8 matches Omar Sívori (1957–58), 9 goals in 10 matches Pietro Anastasi (1974–75)
 Most goals in a single match:
 In a single Italian competition match: 6, Omar Sívori (vs. Internazionale 9–1, 1960–61 Serie A, 28. matchday, 10 June 1961) Joint Serie A record with Silvio Piola (Pro Vercelli–Fiorentina 7–2) on 29 October 1933
 In a single European competition match: 5, Fabrizio Ravanelli (vs. CSKA Sofia 5–1, 1994–95 UEFA Cup, 27 September 1994) 
 Most goals with Italy national team:
 In total aggregate: Alessandro Del Piero – 27 goals in 91 matches – and Roberto Baggio – 27 goals in 56 matches
 In a single World Football Championship: Paolo Rossi (1982) and Salvatore Schillaci (1990) – 6 goals in 7 matches
 Total aggregate in World Football Championships: Paolo Rossi and Roberto Baggio – 9 goals

All-time top 10 goalscorers 
As of 12 April 2022 (competitive matches only):

 Italian championship = Serie A + Serie B.
 Europe = European Champions Cup/Champions League, Inter-Cities Fairs Cup, UEFA Cup/Europa League, Cup Winners' Cup, UEFA Intertoto Cup.
 Other = Supercoppa Italiana, UEFA Super Cup, Intercontinental Cup, European Cup Playoff, Central European Cup (Mitropa Cup).

Juventus’ Capocannoniere (= Serie A Topscorer) in a single Prima Divisione/Serie A season

Trophies 
As of 19 May 2021:

Players 

 Note: bold signifies current Juventus player.
ECC/CL = European Champions Cup/Champions League, CWC = Cup Winners' Cup, EuSC = European Super Cup, IntCup = Intercontinental Cup, ITC = Intertoto Cup.

Managers 

 Note: bold signifies current Juventus manager.
 ECC/CL = European Champions Cup/Champions League, CWC = Cup Winners' Cup, EuSC = European Super Cup, IntCup = Intercontinental Cup, ITC = Intertoto Cup.

Individual recognitions

Ballon d'Or 

* Juventus is the Italian team, and second overall, with the most players recognized with the FIFA World Player of the Year Award (3 players in 4 times).

UEFA Club Footballer of the Year/UEFA Men's Player of the Year Award 

* Gianluigi Buffon is the only goalkeeper to ever win this award.

The Best FIFA Goalkeeper

UEFA Club Football Awards for the Best Goalkeeper

UEFA Club Football Awards for the Best Midfielder

UEFA Team of the Year 
Most appearances: 5  Gianluigi Buffon: 2003, 2004, 2006, 2016, 2017

UEFA Champions League Squad of the Season 
Most appearances: 2  Gianluigi Buffon: 2015, 2017,  Giorgio Chiellini: 2015, 2018

UEFA Europa League Squad of the Season 
Most appearances: 1  Gianluigi Buffon: 2014,  Leonardo Bonucci: 2014,  Andrea Pirlo: 2014,  Carlos Tévez: 2014

UEFA Golden Player Award 1955–2005

Serie A Players of the Year Awards 

Serie A Footballer of the Year

* Juventus is the Italian team with the most players recognized with a Serie A Footballer of the Year title (9 players on 12 occasions).

* Gianluigi Buffon is the only goalkeeper to ever win this award.

* Andrea Pirlo is one of only two players to win this award 3 times.

* Andrea Pirlo is the only player to win this award 3 consecutive times.

Serie A Italian Footballer of the Year

* Alessandro Del Piero is one of only two players to win this award multiple times & is 2nd overall.

Serie A Foreign Footballer of the Year

Serie A Goalkeeper of the Year (From 1997 to 2010)/

* Juventus is the Italian team with the most goalkeepers recognized with a Serie A Goalkeeper of the Year title (2 players on 8 occasions), including the only goalkeeper to win it 8 times, Gianluigi Buffon.
The 1st two times Gianluigi Buffon won this title, he was playing for Parma.
Angelo Peruzzi won this title a 3rd time (joint 2nd overall), when he was playing for Lazio.

Serie A Defender of the Year (From 1997 to 2010)

* Juventus is the Italian team with the most defenders recognized with a Serie A Defender of the Year title (2 players on 5 occasions),

Serie A Awards (Started in 2018)

Serie A Team of the Year (started in 2010–11)

Goalkeepers in Serie A Team of the Year (started in 2010–11)

* Juventus is the Italian team with the most goalkeepers recognized with a Serie A Team of the Year title (1 player on 5 occasions), including the only goalkeeper to win it 5 times, Gianluigi Buffon.

* Gianluigi Buffon has in total been Serie A best goalkeeper a record 13 times (8 times Serie A Goalkeeper of the Year (From 1997 to 2010) + 5 times Goalkeeper in Serie A Team of the Year).

Defenders in Serie A Team of the Year (started in 2010–11)

* Juventus is the Italian team with the most defenders recognized with a Serie A Defender of the Year title (7 players on 9 occasions), including the only defender to win it 5 times, Giorgio Chiellini.

* Giorgio Chiellini has in total been Serie A best defender a record 8 times (3 times Serie A Defender of the Year (From 1997 to 2010) + 5 times Defender in Serie A Team of the Year).

Midfielders in Serie A Team of the Year (started in 2010–11)

* Juventus is the Italian team with the most midfielders recognized with a Serie A Midfielder of the Year title (5 players on 10 occasions), including 2 of the 3 midfielders to win it 4 times, Andrea Pirlo and Miralem Pjanić.

* Andrea Pirlo & Miralem Pjanić have in total been Serie A best midfielders a joint record 4 times (4 times Midfielder in Serie A Team of the Year).
The first time Miralem Pjanić won this title, he was playing for Roma.

Forwards in Serie A Team of the Year (started in 2010–11)

* Juventus is the Italian team with the most forwards recognized with a Serie A Forward of the Year title (4 players on 8 occasions), including the only forward to win it 4 times, Paulo Dybala.

* Paulo Dybala has in total been Serie A best forward a record 4 times (4 times Forward in Serie A Team of the Year).

The first two times Gonzalo Higuaín won this title, he was playing for Napoli.

Most appearances in Serie A Team of the Year:
 5  Gianluigi Buffon: 2012, 2014, 2015, 2016, 2017,  Giorgio Chiellini: 2013, 2015, 2016, 2018, 2019
 4  Andrea Pirlo: 2012, 2013, 2014, 2015,  Andrea Barzagli: 2012, 2013, 2014, 2016,  Leonardo Bonucci: 2015, 2016, 2017, 2020,  Paulo Dybala: 2016, 2017, 2018, 2020

 Juventus has 18 different players inducted in the Serie A Team of the Year, more than other Italian club.

Serie A Coach of the Year

European Footballer of the Year (Ballon d'Or) 

* Juventus is the Italian team with the most players recognized with the Ballon d'Or (6 players on 8 occasions), as well as the team with the third most overall.

World Soccer Player of the Year 

* Juventus is the Italian team, and second overall, with the most players recognized with the World Soccer Player of the Year Award (7 players in 8 times).

Golden Foot International Football Award

European Golden Boy

Kopa Trophy

Club records 
 Consecutive League football championship titles: 9 (from 2011–12 to 2019–20)
 Consecutive Coppa Italia titles: 4 (from 2014–15 to 2017–18)
 Consecutive Doubles: 4 (from 2014–15 to 2017–18)

First competitive matches 
 In Italian competition: vs. FC Torinese, Third Federal Championship, First Round, First Leg, 11 March 1900 (lost 1–0)
 In European competition (since the Union of European Football Associations): vs. Wiener SK, European Champions Clubs' Cup 1958–59, First Round, First Leg, 24 September 1958 (won 3–1)

Club records 
As of 20 May 2018.
 Victories and defeats:
 Home victory: 11–0 vs. Fiorentina, Federal Championship, 7 October 192811–0 vs. Fiumana, Federal Championship, 4 November 1928
 Away victory: 15–0 vs. Cento, Coppa Italia, second round, 6 January 1927
 Home defeat: 0–8 vs. Torino Calcio, Federal Championship, 17 November 1912
 Away defeat: 1–8 vs. Milan, 14 January 1912
 Most points in any top five European domestic league
 102 in 38 games (2013–14)
 Most points in a season:
 3 points for a win: 102 in 38 games (2013–14)
 2 points for a win: 62 in 38 games (1949–50)
 Most league victories in a season: 33 in 38 games (2013–14)
 Most home wins in a season: 19 in 19 games (2013–14)
 Fewest league draws in a season: 3 in 38 games (2013–14)
 Most league draws in a season: 17 in 34 games (1955–56)
 Fewest league defeats in a season: 0 in 38 games (2011–12)
 Most league defeats in a season: 15 in 38 games (1961–62, 2009–10)
 Most league goals scored in a season (by team): 103 in 38 games (1950–51)
 Fewest league goals scored in a season (by team): 28 in 30 games (1938–39)
 Fewest league goals conceded in a season (by team): 14 in 30 games (1981–82)
 Most league goals conceded in a season (by team): 56 in 34 games (1961–62)
 Longest sequence of League victories:
 In a single season: 15, since 11th match on 31 October 2015 (Juventus 2–1 Torino) to 25th match on 13 February 2016 (Juventus 1–0 Napoli)
 Overlapping seasons: 13, since the 32nd match of the 2013–14 season to the 6th match of the 2014–15 season
 Since the first match in a single season: 9, (2005–06)
 Longest sequence of unbeaten league matches (consecutive matches):
 In a single season: 38 (2011–12. With 38 matches in the 2011–12 league season, Juventus finished unbeaten in the league)
 Overall: 49 (since 38th match of the 2010–11 season to 10th match of the 2012–13 season)
 Longest sequence of league matches without a victory:
 In a single season: 8 (1938–39 season and 1955–56 season)
 Overall: 13 (since the eighteenth to thirty-first match of 1955–56 season and since the 12th to 25th match of the 1961–62 season)
 Longest sequence of League defeats:
 Overall and in a single season: 7 (since the third to 28th to 34th match of the 1961–62 season)

Signings 
The sale of Zinedine Zidane to Real Madrid of Spain from Juventus in 2001 was the world football transfer record at the time, costing the Spanish club around €77.5 million (150 billion lire).

The intake of Gianluigi Buffon in 2001 from Parma cost Juventus €52 million (100 billion lire), making it the then-most expensive transfer for a goalkeeper of all-time until 2018.

On 26 July 2016, Juventus signing Gonzalo Higuaín became the third highest football transfer of all-time and highest ever transfer for an Italian club, at the time, when he signed for €90 million from Napoli.

On 8 August 2016, Paul Pogba returned to his first club, Manchester United, for the former record for highest football transfer fee at €105 million, surpassing the previous record holder Gareth Bale.

On 10 July 2018, Cristiano Ronaldo became the highest ever transfer for an Italian club with his €100 million transfer from Real Madrid.

Statistics in international competitions

See also

Honours 
 Juventus F.C. Reserves and Academy honours

Statistics and records 
 Football records and statistics in Italy
 UEFA club competition records and statistics
List of Juventus F.C. seasons

Notes

References

External links 
 

Italian football club statistics
Records